In the 1544 siege of Kojinyama, Takeda Shingen continued his invasion of Shinano Province's Ima Valley, seizing Kojinyama fortress from the Tozawa family.

References
Turnbull, Stephen (1998). 'The Samurai Sourcebook'. London: Cassell & Co.

Kojinyama 1544
Kojinyama 1544
1544 in Japan
Conflicts in 1544